This is the list of cathedrals in Barbados sorted by denomination.

Anglican
St. Michael's Cathedral, Bridgetown (Church in the Province of the West Indies)

Roman Catholic 
Cathedrals of the Roman Catholic Church in Barbados:
St. Patrick's Cathedral, Bridgetown

See also
List of cathedrals

References

Cathedrals in Barbados
Barbados
Cathedrals
Cathedrals